Dávid Kálnoki-Kis (born 6 August 1991) is a Hungarian football player who currently plays for Zalaegerszegi TE.

He joined English club Oldham Athletic on loan in 2009 as part of an agreement between Oldham, MTK and Liverpool. He joined the club's new Development squad. He was given the no. 31 squad number and was named as substitute for the first-team on a number of occasions.  In February 2010 he returned to MTK after his loan period was cut short.

International career
Kálnoki-Kis has represented Hungary at international level as an under-17, under-19 and under-21. He was called up to the senior Hungary squad to face Faroe Islands in August 2016.

Club statistics

Updated to games played as of 19 May 2021.

References

External links
Profile at HLSZ 
Profile at MLSZ 

1991 births
Living people
Footballers from Budapest
Hungarian footballers
Association football defenders
MTK Budapest FC players
Oldham Athletic A.F.C. players
Újpest FC players
Budapest Honvéd FC players
Zalaegerszegi TE players
Nemzeti Bajnokság I players
Nemzeti Bajnokság II players
Nemzeti Bajnokság III players
Hungarian expatriate footballers
Expatriate footballers in England
Hungarian expatriate sportspeople in England